The DC Comics rating system is a system for rating the content of comic books used by DC Comics. In 2011, DC Comics decided to withdraw from the Comics Code Authority and implement their own rating system for their comics. Rather than replicating the system used by Marvel Comics, DC Comics' system is more similar to video game ratings, specifically the ESRB. A few months later, Image Comics implemented a similar rating system to their own comics that followed the same system as DC.

System
The DC Comics Rating System assigns each comic book one of the following ratings:
E – EVERYONE – Appropriate for readers of all ages. May contain cartoon violence and/or some comic mischief.
T – TEEN – Appropriate for readers age 12 and older. May contain mild violence, language and/or suggestive themes.
T+ – TEEN PLUS – Appropriate for readers age 15 and older. May contain moderate violence, mild profanity, graphic imagery and/or suggestive themes.
M – MATURE – Appropriate for readers age 17 and older. May contain intense violence, extensive profanity, nudity, sexual themes and other content suitable only for older readers.

See also
 Marvel Comics rating system

References

External links

DC Comics
Media content ratings systems
2011 introductions
2011 in comics